Mauro Iván Obolo (born 28 September 1981) is a former Argentine footballer.

Club career

Obolo started his professional career with Vélez Sársfield. He made his flight top debut in the Argentine Primera on 27 April 1999 against Gimnasia de Jujuy. Obolo's first spell at Vélez lasted until June 2001. Subsequently, he was loaned to Belgrano where he had a successful run, followed by a short stint in Italy with Piacenza. The Apertura 2003 marked the returned of Obolo to "El Fortín". He played for Vélez until the end of the Clausura 2004. Next, he went on loan again to play for Argentine club Lanús and later for Burgos CF in Spain.

Obolo joined Arsenal de Sarandí as a free agent in 2006, and he became a key player for the club, appearing in all 19 of the Clausura 2007 games, and finishing as the club's top scorer with five goals.

Along with fellow countryman Lucas Valdemarín, Obolo moved to Swedish side AIK on 1 July 2007. At his arrival he immediately justified his transfer by showing class and flair on the pitch. He quickly became a key player at his new club. After winning both the Swedish league and cup 2009 he turned back home.

In January 2010, Obolo returned to Arsenal de Sarandí.
On his return has scored 25 goals in 76 games, and also instrumental in the shares, so it is again tempted by large teams of South America as Grêmio, Boca Juniors and Vélez Sársfield.

On 10 January 2012, Obolo signed a three-year deal with Vélez Sársfield, in an undisclosed fee, rumoured to be a $1M fee. He then made his debut on 7 February, in a Copa Libertadores match against Defensor Sporting, getting on the scoresheet.

In early 2017 Obolo retired from professional football.

Honours

AIK 
 Allsvenskan: 2009
 Svenska Cupen: 2009

References

External links
 Profile at Vélez Sársfield's official website 
 Un fortinero en Suecia 
 Argentine Primera statistics at Fútbol XXI  

Living people
1981 births
AIK Fotboll players
Argentine footballers
Arsenal de Sarandí footballers
Club Atlético Belgrano footballers
Burgos CF footballers
Association football forwards
Club Atlético Lanús footballers
Godoy Cruz Antonio Tomba footballers
Sportspeople from Córdoba Province, Argentina
Piacenza Calcio 1919 players
Club Atlético Vélez Sarsfield footballers
Club Deportivo Universidad Católica footballers
Argentine Primera División players
Serie A players
Allsvenskan players
Segunda División B players
Chilean Primera División players
Expatriate footballers in Italy
Expatriate footballers in Sweden
Expatriate footballers in Spain
Expatriate footballers in Chile
Argentine expatriate sportspeople in Italy
Argentine expatriate sportspeople in Spain
Argentine expatriate sportspeople in Sweden
Argentine expatriate footballers
Argentine people of Italian descent